Pablo Torres Muiño (born 27 November 1987 in Cambre) is a Spanish former cyclist, who competed as a professional from 2012 to 2020. He competed in the 2018 Vuelta a España.

Major results

2005
 2nd Road race, National Junior Road Championships
2013
 6th Overall Tour of China II
2015
 1st  Sprints classification Vuelta a Asturias
 5th Overall Vuelta a la Comunidad de Madrid
 8th Overall Tour de Gironde
2016
 6th Circuito de Getxo
 7th Overall Tour de Gironde
 10th Overall Vuelta a la Comunidad de Madrid
2017
 1st Overall Tour de Gironde
1st Points classification
1st Stage 2
 8th Overall Troféu Joaquim Agostinho
 10th Overall Ronde de l'Oise
 10th Prueba Villafranca de Ordizia
2018
 7th Overall Vuelta a la Comunidad de Madrid
2019
 1st Stage 7 Tour of Japan

Grand Tour general classification results timeline

References

External links

1987 births
Living people
Spanish male cyclists
Cyclists from Galicia (Spain)
Sportspeople from the Province of A Coruña
People from A Coruña (comarca)